Gunnar Normann Eliassen (24 April 1907 – 23 September 1971) was a Norwegian athlete and wrestler.

He was born in Bærum, and worked for about forty years at the paper factory Granfos Bruk. He was awarded the Society for Development medal for longstanding service. He also lived in Bærum.

As a sportsman he represented the clubs Stabekk AIL, Lilleaker IF and IL Liull. In amateur wrestling he took a national "middleweight B" (a slightly different weight class than middleweight A) title in 1936, but also finished as a runner-up nine times. His main claim to fame was winning a bronze medal at the 1937 Workers' Olympiad. In athletics, he specialized in the high jump and was the runner-up at the Norwegian Workers' Championships at one occasion.

Eliassen was active politically. For this, during the occupation of Norway by Nazi Germany he was imprisoned in Bredtveit concentration camp from 6 February to 11 March 1942. In April 1940, he had served at Oscarsborg Fortress when German cruiser Blücher was sunk by the cannons there. He died in September 1971 and was buried at Ullern Church.

References 

1907 births
1971 deaths
Sportspeople from Bærum
Norwegian male sport wrestlers
Norwegian male high jumpers
Norwegian resistance members
Bredtveit concentration camp survivors
20th-century Norwegian people